The Canaanite and Aramaic inscriptions, also known as Northwest Semitic inscriptions, are the primary extra-Biblical source for understanding of the society and history of the ancient Phoenicians, Hebrews and Arameans. Semitic inscriptions may occur on stone slabs, pottery ostraca, ornaments, and range from simple names to full texts. 
The older inscriptions form a Canaanite–Aramaic dialect continuum, exemplified by writings which scholars have struggled to fit into either category, such as the Stele of Zakkur and the Deir Alla Inscription.

The Northwest Semitic languages are a language group that contains the Aramaic language, as well as the Canaanite languages including Phoenician and Hebrew.

Languages 

The old Aramaic period (850 to 612 BC) saw the production and dispersal of inscriptions due to the rise of the Arameans as a major force in Ancient Near East. Their language was adopted as an international language of diplomacy, particularly during the late stages of the Neo-Assyrian Empire as well as the spread of Aramaic speakers from Egypt to Mesopotamia. The first known Aramaic inscription was the Carpentras Stela, found in southern France in 1704; it was considered to be Phoenician text at the time.

Only 10,000 inscriptions in Phoenician-Punic, a Canaanite language, are known, such that "Phoenician probably remains the worst transmitted and least known of all Semitic languages."  The only other substantial source for Phoenician-Punic are the excerpts in Poenulus, a play written by the Roman writer Plautus (see  for an analysis). Within the corpus of inscriptions only 668 words have been attested, including 321 hapax legomena (words only attested a single time), per Wolfgang Röllig's analysis in 1983. This compares to the Bible's 7000–8000 words and 1500 hapax legomena, in Biblical Hebrew. The first published Phoenician-Punic inscription was from the Cippi of Melqart, found in 1694 in Malta; the first published such inscription from the Phoenician "homeland" was the Eshmunazar II sarcophagus published in 1855.

Fewer than 2,000 inscriptions in Ancient Hebrew, another Canaanite language, are known, of which the vast majority comprise just a single letter or word. The first detailed Ancient Hebrew inscription published was the Royal Steward inscription, found in 1870.

List of notable inscriptions
The inscriptions written in ancient Northwest Semitic script (Canaanite and Aramaic) have been catalogued into multiple corpora (i.e. lists) over the last two centuries. The primary corpora to have been produced are as follows:

 : Hamaker's review assessed 13 inscriptions
  In the 1830s, only approximately 80 inscriptions and 60 coins were known in the entire Phoenicio-Punic corpus
 : The first study of Phoenician grammar, listed 332 texts known at the time
  CIS: Corpus Inscriptionum Semiticarum; the first section is focused on Phoenician-Punic inscriptions (176 "Phoenician" inscriptions and 5982 "Punic" inscriptions)
  KAI: Kanaanäische und Aramäische Inschriften, considered the "gold standard" for the last fifty years
  NSI: George Albert Cooke, 1903: 
  NE: Mark Lidzbarski, 1898:  and 
 KI: 
 TSSI:  Volume III. Phoenician Inscriptions, Including Inscriptions in the Mixed Dialect of Arslan Tash (Oxford: OUP, 1982)
 TAD: Bezalel Porten and Ada Yardeni (1986-2000), Textbook of Aramaic Documents from Ancient Egypt
 
 

The inscriptions listed below include those which are mentioned in multiple editions of the corpora above (the numbers in the concordance column cross-refer to the works above), as well as newer inscriptions which have been published since the corpora above were published (references provided individually).

Bibliography

See also
 List of inscriptions in biblical archaeology
 Carthaginian tombstones
 Epigraphy
 Ancient Hebrew writings

References

 
Archaeological corpora
Semitic languages
Inscriptions by languages
Phoenician inscriptions
Phoenician-Punic studies